Jacques Zimako (28 December 1951 – 8 December 2021) was a French professional footballer who played as a forward.

Biography
Zimako was born in Lifou, New Caledonia. He played for SC Bastia, AS Saint-Étienne and FC Sochaux-Montbéliard. He was capped 13 times for France national team, scoring two goals. He was the first footballer of Kanak origin to play for France and the cousin of Marc-Kanyan Case.

He died on 8 December 2021, at the age of 69.

Honours
Saint-Étienne
 Division 1: 1981

References

External links
 

1951 births
2021 deaths
People from the Loyalty Islands
Association football forwards
French footballers
France international footballers
Ligue 1 players
SC Bastia players
AS Saint-Étienne players
FC Sochaux-Montbéliard players
French people of New Caledonian descent
Kanak people